Artemi Sergeyevich Panarin (born 30 October 1991), nicknamed the "Breadman", or simply "Bread", is a Russian professional ice hockey winger and alternate captain for the New York Rangers of the National Hockey League (NHL). He has previously played for Vityaz Chekov, Ak Bars Kazan, SKA Saint Petersburg, the Chicago Blackhawks and the Columbus Blue Jackets.

Originally an undrafted player, Panarin began his professional career playing in the Kontinental Hockey League in his native Russia. He made his NHL debut in 2015 after signing an entry-level contract with the Blackhawks. Panarin won the Calder Memorial Trophy in the 2015–16 season as the league's top rookie.

Early life
Panarin was born and raised in Korkino. He developed an early interest in ice skating. His maternal grandfather, a former amateur hockey player, encouraged Panarin to play hockey when he was five years old. He helped train Panarin and would often drive him to hockey tournaments in Tyumen. Panarin attended the Traktor Ice Hockey school in Chelyabinsk, where he trained six days a week for six months a year.

Playing career

KHL
Panarin was not selected in the 2010 NHL Entry Draft and began his professional hockey career in the Kontinental Hockey League (KHL) with HC Vityaz. On 31 January 2013, having produced 18 points in 40 games, Panarin was traded to SKA Saint Petersburg in exchange for a draft pick. In the 2014–15 season, Panarin recorded 26 goals and 62 points in 54 appearances for SKA. He played a significant role in the team's championship run, scoring 20 points in 20 playoff games. He was named to the KHL first all-star team for the 2014–15 season.

NHL

Chicago Blackhawks
On 29 April 2015, Panarin signed a two-year, entry-level contract with the NHL's Chicago Blackhawks. He scored his first career NHL goal on 7 October 2015 against Henrik Lundqvist of the New York Rangers, the first goal scored by the Blackhawks in their first game of the 2015–16 season. On 17 February 2016, in another game against the Rangers, Panarin scored his first career NHL hat-trick. He appeared in 80 games for the Blackhawks during the 2015–16 season and recorded 30 goals and 47 assists for 77 points, which led all NHL rookies and ranked within the top-ten amongst all NHL skaters. Panarin found instant chemistry with Patrick Kane and fellow Russian Artem Anisimov on the Blackhawks' second line. Kane, who was the NHL's MVP and leading scorer in 2015–16, cited Panarin as a major contributor to his successful season.

Panarin scored his first Stanley Cup playoff goal on 15 April in Game 2 of the 2016 playoffs against the St. Louis Blues. During the playoffs, he registered seven points. Panarin was awarded the Calder Memorial Trophy, awarded to the NHL's top rookie, at the 2016 NHL Awards on 22 June. Panarin was also awarded the 2015–16 Kharlamov Trophy, given to the best professional Russian hockey player by the Russian Hall of Fame. He also earned a $2.55 million bonus pursuant to his contract for finishing the season in the top-ten among forwards in scoring. Panarin expressed his gratitude to Kane for helping him reach his contract incentives by gifting him a luxury watch.

In the 2016–17 season, Panarin built upon his rookie season, continuing his offensive role playing alongside Kane. On 9 November 2016 in a game against the St. Louis Blues, Panarin recorded his first career Gordie Howe hat-trick. On 26 December, Panarin signed a new two-year, $12 million contract with Chicago effective for the 2017–18 and 2018–19 seasons. He completed his second North American season scoring a career-best 31 goals in collecting 74 points in 82 games and was named to the NHL's Second All-Star Team.

Columbus Blue Jackets
On 23 June 2017, Panarin was traded to the Columbus Blue Jackets (along with Tyler Motte and a sixth-round pick in the 2017 NHL Entry Draft) in exchange for Brandon Saad, Anton Forsberg, and a fifth-round pick in the 2018 NHL Entry Draft.

Panarin had a record-tying achievement of picking up five primary assists in one game on 8 December 2017 to help Columbus defeat the New Jersey Devils 5–3. On 20 March 2018, Panarin scored his second career hat-trick (and added an assist) to clinch a 5–3 Columbus win over the New York Rangers. On 3 April, Panarin surpassed the Blue Jackets' franchise points record after scoring 80 points in 80 games, finishing the season with 82. The following season, Panarin would break his own record, setting a new Blue Jackets-franchise point-scoring record with 87 points.

New York Rangers

On 1 July 2019, Panarin signed a seven-year, $81.5 million contract with the New York Rangers, worth an annual average of $11.642 million. Panarin scored his first goal as a Ranger on a power play during the 2019–20 season opener against the Winnipeg Jets on 3 October, and also notched an assist on Jacob Trouba's first goal with the team.

By 5 October 2019, Panarin had the third-most assists and was tied for second in the NHL in points on the road since starting the start of his NHL career. On 9 January 2020, Panarin became the first player in Rangers history to have 60 points in the first 43 career games as a Ranger, edging out Wayne Gretzky who had 59. Later, on 13 January, Panarin made Rangers history three times during the game. He became the first Ranger to record six three-point games in a nine-game span (six goals, 16 assists). He also became the second Ranger to record nine plus points in four consecutive games, and the second Ranger in last 40 seasons with 67 points through the team's first 45 games. Panarin concluded the shortened 2019–20 regular season by recording a career-high 95 points from 32 goals and 63 assists. He finished tied with David Pastrňák for third overall in scoring among all NHL skaters. He was also a finalist for the Hart Memorial Trophy, awarded to the NHL's most valuable player.

On 22 February 2021, Panarin announced he would take a personal leave of absence. He returned to practice with the Rangers on 10 March 2021. Panarin was ruled out for the final three games of the season with a lower-body injury following an on-ice brawl with Tom Wilson on 3 May. He finished the 2020–21 NHL season with 17 goals and 41 assists in 42 games.

On 7 December 2022, during a game against the Vegas Golden Knights, Panarin recorded his 600th career point. Among active players at that time, he became the fifth fastest player to do so in 536 games, behind Evgeni Malkin (490), Alex Ovechkin (464), Sidney Crosby (430), and Connor McDavid (421).

International play

Junior
Panarin was part of the Russian men's junior team that won a gold medal at the 2011 World Junior Ice Hockey Championships. Russia was trailing Canada 3–0 in the third period of the championship game; Panarin made the score 3–1 with 17:27 remaining in the third period to prompt a Russia comeback. He would go on to score the game-winner with 4:38 left to play en route to a 5–3 Russia win.

Senior
Panarin made his Russian senior team debut, when he was included on the roster, in one of the rounds of EuroHockeyTour in the 2013–14 season.

He was selected to the top senior squad for Russia's hockey team in the 2015 IIHF World Championship, earning a silver medal. He recorded ten points in 10 games.

Panarin also played in the 2016 IIHF World Championship, where Russia earned a bronze medal. Early in the tournament, head coach Oleg Znarok formed a highly-productive line of Panarin (six goals and nine assists) and his former SKA Saint Petersburg teammates Vadim Shipachyov (6 goals and 12 assists) and Evgenii Dadonov (six goals and seven assists). Panarin, Shipachyov and Dadonov finished as the top three scorers of the tournament.

Panarin represented Russia at the 2016 World Cup of Hockey.

Personal life
Panarin moved to the United States in August 2015 after joining the Chicago Blackhawks. He did not speak English at the time and moved in with a Russian-born family who were Chicago residents. The family helped Panarin transition to his new surroundings and culture. Panarin also has a personal translator who helps him conduct interviews before and after games. His fellow Russian teammates, Viktor Tikhonov, who briefly played with the Blackhawks in 2015, and Artem Anisimov, also helped Panarin understand English while playing in North America. Panarin was affectionately nicknamed the "Breadman", a reference to the Panera Bread restaurant chain, by his teammates and coaches on the Blackhawks.

In a July 2019 interview with Vsemu Golovin, Panarin strongly criticized president of Russia Vladimir Putin, saying, "The mistake in our society is treating him like a superhuman. He is a regular person, like us, and he is serving us... Yes, to be a president you have to be smart and enlightened, but our biggest mistake, among many, is thinking that we have nobody better than Vladimir Vladimirovich. This is nonsense. How many million people live here? No question there is someone better." Sportsnet claimed that Panarin is by far the biggest Russian athlete to speak out against Putin, and Russian-American ice hockey reporter Slava Malamud, who translated the interview, claimed that it was unprecedented in Russian sports for someone of Panarin's caliber to be so critical of Putin.

On 22 February 2021, Panarin announced he would take a personal leave of absence after the Russian tabloid newspaper Komsomolskaya Pravda published allegations that he physically assaulted an 18-year-old woman in 2011, and bribed law enforcement to drop the charges. Panarin and the Rangers denied the story's veracity, stating: "This is clearly an intimidation tactic being used against [Panarin] for being outspoken on recent political events." The allegations were made by his former KHL coach Andrei Nazarov, who coached him during his time with Vityaz Chekhov. The story was released after Panarin voiced his support for Russian opposition leader Alexei Navalny, openly criticizing Putin. Nazarov said that he was motivated to make the allegations after Panarin voiced his support for anti-government protests in Russia. Nazarov claimed that Panarin's then teammate, Mikhail Anisin, was there at the incident. While Anisin confirmed there was an encounter with young women, he denied that there was any violence, and called the allegations "disgusting". Panarin returned to practice on 10 March.

Career statistics

Regular season and playoffs

International

Awards and honors

References

External links

 

1991 births
Living people
Ak Bars Kazan players
Calder Trophy winners
Chicago Blackhawks players
Columbus Blue Jackets players
HC Vityaz players
New York Rangers players
People from Korkino
Russian expatriate ice hockey people
Russian expatriate sportspeople in the United States
Russian ice hockey left wingers
SKA Saint Petersburg players
Sportspeople from Chelyabinsk Oblast
Undrafted National Hockey League players